Char is a French feminine given name that is a variation of Chardonnay, Charlene, and Charlotte and a feminine form of Charles. Char is also used as a variation of Charmaine. Notable people with this name include the following:

Mononym
Char (musician), professional name of Hisato Takenaka (born 1955), a Japanese musician, singer-songwriter and record producer

Given name
Char Fontane (1952 – 2007), an American actress
Char Davies (born 1954), Canadian artist
Char Margolis (born 1951), an American spiritualist
Char Pouaka (born 1973), New Zealand softball player
Char-ron Dorsey (born 1977), American gridiron football

Surname
Fuad Char (born 1937), Colombian politician
René Char (1907 – 1988), a French poet
Sofia Daccarett Char (born 1993), better known as Sofia Carson, American actress and singer

Middle name
Alejandro Char Chaljub (born 1966), Colombian politician 
Arturo Char Chaljub (born 1967), Colombian politician
David Char Navas, Colombian politician

Fictional character
Bron-Char, Marvel Comics character
Char Aznable, from the Gundam franchise

Nickname

See also

Cha (Korean surname)
Chad (name)
Chai (surname)
Chal (name)
Chan (surname)
Chao (surname)
Chara (given name)
Chara (surname)
Chard (name)
Chari (surname)
Charl (name)
Charo (name)
Chas (given name)
Chay (given name)
Chaz

Notes

French feminine given names